Moringua is a genus of eels of the family Moringuidae that occur in shallow tropical and subtropical waters.  It contains these described species:

 Moringua abbreviata (Bleeker, 1863)
 Moringua arundinacea (McClelland, 1844) (Bengal spaghetti eel)
 Moringua bicolor Kaup, 1856
 Moringua edwardsi (D. S. Jordan & Bollman, 1889) (spaghetti eel)
 Moringua ferruginea Bliss, 1883 (rusty spaghetti eel)
 Moringua javanica (Kaup, 1856) (Java spaghetti eel)
 Moringua macrocephalus (Bleeker, 1863)
 Moringua macrochir Bleeker, 1855 
 Moringua microchir Bleeker, 1853 (lesser thrush eel)
 Moringua penni L. P. Schultz, 1953 (Penn's thrush eel)
 Moringua raitaborua (F. Hamilton, 1822) (purple spaghetti eel)

References

Moringuidae
Ray-finned fish genera
Taxa named by John Edward Gray